Valdeir "Badú" Vieira (born 11 July 1944 in Marília, São Paulo) is a Brazilian football manager.

Career

Playing career
Like many Brazilian players in the 1960s, Badu was discovered in the ever-expanding futsal scene. It is from the indoors that Vieira gets his nickname "Badu", which describes a specific way of scoring a goal. He signed his first contract as a professional with the 2nd division Dracena F.C. at age 17. Two years later he played as attacker in the 1st division with CE Aymoré – São Leopoldo, where Luiz Felipe Scolari was just starting his career as a defender in the youth team. Badu was later the first Brazilian to play respectively for the clubs: Central Español (Uruguay), Hibernians F.C. (Malta) and Croissant Club Sigois (Algeria). Plagued by injuries and more interested in studying the sciences of sports, he finished his career playing non-league football in Germany.

Coaching career
Badu has managed several clubs and national football teams. He managed Costa Rica during 1996 and Oman from 1998 to 1999. He managed Iran during their successful qualification for the 1998 World Cup. On 28 December 2013, Vieira signed with Japan's J2 League side Kyoto Sanga FC, which he managed until 18 June 2014.

Managerial statistics

Honours
 1987 Venezuela Coach of the Year
 1988 Copa de Venezuela
 1992 Best Newcomer in the Campeonato Catarinense
 1995 Best foreign coach in Costa Rica
 1995–96 Primera División de Costa Rica Winner
 1996 Copa Interclubes UNCAF
 1996–97 Primera División de Costa Rica Winner
 2001–02 Kuwaiti Premier League Winner
 2001–02 Al Kurafi Cup Winner
 2003 Gulf Club Champions Cup Winner
 2008 JFL Regional League Champions
 2008 Japan National Amateur Champions
 2009 Hokushin'etsu Regional Div.1 Runners Up
 2010–11 Bahrain 2nd Division Champions

References

External links

1944 births
Living people
Footballers from São Paulo (state)
Brazilian football managers
Brazilian expatriate football managers
Expatriate football managers in Venezuela
Expatriate football managers in Costa Rica
Expatriate football managers in Morocco
Expatriate football managers in Saudi Arabia
Expatriate football managers in Iran
Expatriate football managers in Oman
Expatriate football managers in Japan
J2 League managers
Caracas FC managers
Deportivo Italia managers
Brusque Futebol Clube managers
L.D. Alajuelense managers
Costa Rica national football team managers
Iran national football team managers
Oman national football team managers
Al-Ta'ee managers
Raja CA managers
Deportivo Saprissa managers
Al-Arabi SC (Kuwait) managers
AC Nagano Parceiro managers
Al-Ramtha SC managers
Kyoto Sanga FC managers
Kuwait Premier League managers
Saudi Professional League managers
Saudi First Division League managers
Expatriate football managers in Kuwait
Brazilian expatriate sportspeople in Kuwait
Brazilian expatriate sportspeople in Japan
Brazilian expatriate sportspeople in Iran
Brazilian expatriate sportspeople in Costa Rica
Brazilian expatriate sportspeople in Oman
Brazilian expatriate sportspeople in Morocco
Brazilian expatriate sportspeople in Saudi Arabia
Brazilian expatriate sportspeople in Venezuela
Brazilian expatriate sportspeople in Bahrain
Expatriate football managers in Bahrain
Botola managers